Di doo dah is the debut solo album by Jane Birkin, released in 1973 on Fontana Records. Subsequent reissues in 2001 and 2010 (on Light In The Attic Records) included two bonus tracks from the 1972 7" single "La Décadanse" by Birkin and Serge Gainsbourg.

Track listing
Words and music by Serge Gainsbourg, except "Encore lui", "Leur plaisir sans moi", "La cible qui bouge" and "C'est la vie qui veut ça" by Serge Gainsbourg and Jean-Claude Vannier

"Di doo dah" (3:35)
"Help camionneur!" (2:48)
"Encore lui" (2:26)
"Puisque je te le dis" (2:35)
"Les capotes anglaises" (2:13)
"Leur plaisir sans moi" (1:43)
"Mon amour baiser" (2:33)
"Banana boat" (2:19)
"Kawasaki" (2:34)
"La cible qui bouge" (3:10)
"La baigneuse de Brighton" (2:16)
"C'est la vie qui veut ça" (2:17)
"La Décadanse" (5:20) (bonus track)
"Les Langues De Chat" (2:17) (bonus track)

"Help camionneur!" uses the same melody as "My Green Heart" (Les Cœurs Verts O.S.T., 1966) and "Le canari est sur le balcon" (Je T'aime Moi Non Plus, 1969)

Personnel
Peter Olliff - music engineer
Jean-Claude Charvier - arrangements, conductor, vocals engineer
Sam Lévin - front cover photography
Tony Frank - photography

Jane Birkin albums
1973 debut albums
Albums arranged by Jean-Claude Vannier
Fontana Records albums